Edward Francis Larkin (July 1, 1885 – March 28, 1934) was an American Major League Baseball catcher. He played for the Philadelphia Athletics during the  season.

References

External links

1885 births
1934 deaths
People from Wyalusing, Pennsylvania
Major League Baseball catchers
Philadelphia Athletics players
Baseball players from Pennsylvania
Lehigh Mountain Hawks baseball players
Minor league baseball managers